Kirt Thompson (born December 13, 1967) is a retired male javelin thrower from Trinidad and Tobago, who represented his native country at the 1996 Summer Olympics in Atlanta, Georgia. He set his personal best (78.06 metres) on May 25, 1996 in Riverside. Thompson was affiliated with the Ashland University.

Achievements

References

sports-reference

1967 births
Living people
Trinidad and Tobago male javelin throwers
Athletes (track and field) at the 1996 Summer Olympics
Olympic athletes of Trinidad and Tobago
Ashland Eagles men's track and field athletes
Central American and Caribbean Games bronze medalists for Trinidad and Tobago
Competitors at the 1990 Central American and Caribbean Games
Central American and Caribbean Games medalists in athletics